The ninth season of Two and a Half Men premiered on CBS on September 19, 2011, with Ashton Kutcher joining the cast as Walden Schmidt. This season is the first without the show's previous star Charlie Sheen, and features a rebooted plot, marking a major change in the series by focusing on Alan and Jake coping with life after the death of Charlie, with help from their new best friend and housemate, Walden, a dot-com billionaire who is in the process of being divorced by his wife. The trio bond and form a surrogate family unit. This was the last season to air on Mondays.

Cast

Main

Note: The billing for the regular characters changed in the opening credits this season in that Jon Cryer and Ashton Kutcher are listed at the same time and Conchata Ferrell is listed before Marin Hinkle. The Complete Ninth Season DVD cover dropped Marin Hinkle's name and character from the cast list altogether, and CBS press releases for season 9 billed Hinkle as a recurring cast member.

 Ashton Kutcher as Walden Schmidt
 Jon Cryer as Alan Harper
 Angus T. Jones as Jake Harper
 Conchata Ferrell as Berta
 Marin Hinkle as Judith Harper-Melnick
 Holland Taylor as Evelyn Harper

Recurring
 Sophie Winkleman as Zoey Hyde-Tottingham-Pierce
 Courtney Thorne-Smith as Lyndsey McElroy
 Graham Patrick Martin as Eldridge McElroy
 Judy Greer as Bridget Schmidt
 Melanie Lynskey as Rose
 Ryan Stiles as Herb Melnick
 Talyan Wright as Ava Pierce
 Jenny McCarthy as Courtney
 Mimi Rogers as Robin Schmidt
 Patton Oswalt as Billy Stanhope

Guest
 Jenna Elfman as Dharma Finkelstein Montgomery
 Thomas Gibson as Greg Montgomery
 John Stamos as Prospective House Buyer
 Jennifer Taylor as Chelsea
 Emmanuelle Vaugier as Mia
 Tricia Helfer as Gail
 Katherine LaNasa as Lydia
 Jodi Lyn O'Keefe as Isabella
 Missi Pyle as Mrs. Pasternak
 Jeri Ryan as Sherri
 Liz Vassey as Michelle
 Joel Murray as Doug
 Martin Mull as Russell
 Jane Lynch as Dr. Linda Freeman
 Joe Manganiello as Alex
 Taylor Cole as Melanie Laughlin
 Macey Cruthird as Megan
 Vernee Watson as Nurse
 Jonathan Banks as Pawn Broker
 Matthew Marsden as Nigel
 Gary Busey as Alan's hospital roommate
 Georgia Engel as Jean McElroy
 Brian Stepanek as Arthur
 Kathy Bates as Ghost of Charlie Harper
 Jason Alexander as Dr. Goodman

Production
Following Charlie Sheen's firing on March 7, 2011, there was much speculation as to whether the show would be canceled for good, following the cancelation of the previous season. Chuck Lorre revealed that he'd considered ending the show, but thought that it would've been "such a heartbreaking way to end". On May 13, 2011, it was announced that Ashton Kutcher would be taking over from Sheen, playing new character Walden Schmidt. It was also announced that the writers would kill off Charlie Harper. For a revamped show, the producers re-decorated the main set of the beach house, which was used up until the final season.
The theme tune was also revamped, with two new singers used in the opening sequence. The new variation of the theme was used only until the end of this season, before another variation was used for seasons 10 and 11, except for a production error in the third episode of season 10 in which season 9's variation of the theme is heard. Ashton Kutcher assisted Chuck Lorre with the creation of Walden Schmidt and co-wrote the story of "Slowly and in a Circular Fashion", which develops his character. The character of Charlie Harper, despite being killed off, was re-introduced late in the season as a ghost in a woman's body for a guest reprisal, played by Kathy Bates. Chuck Lorre described the casting as a "gender bending role".

CBS president Les Moonves was extremely pleased with the season, saying "This show could last with the current numbers it has for many, many years." Jon Cryer believed that Kutcher had added a new energy to the show and revitalized it.

Episodes

Critical reception
This season received generally mixed reviews.
Lori Rackl of the Chicago Sun Times gave the season positive reviews, saying "filling the void left by a well established character isn't easy, but Kutcher mostly succeeded. At times his character seemed a bit like Lennie petting the rabbits in Of Mice and Men, but give him a few episodes, and he should settle in nicely. After eight long seasons, the show might end up being better off with some new blood – of the non-tiger variety."
Kutcher's performance in the show was praised by Hollywood.com saying "What makes Ashton a suitable replacement for Charlie Sheen is that he does not need to be the main attraction every half-hour. If the writers want to play with side characters, they can—and Ashton rises to the occasion, fitting comfortably into the bathroom."

Ratings

U.S. Nielsen and DVR ratings

Canadian ratings

Australian ratings

 Notes
 Due to an error in ratings data, "The Squat and the Hover" did not appear in the Australian National Top 20 ratings for the night of broadcast. Based on its figure of 964,000 viewers, the episode would have ranked equal-eleventh for the night.

UK ratings

References

General references

External links
 

Season 9
2011 American television seasons
2012 American television seasons